The Gazebo or The Garden Bower is an 1818 oil on canvas painting by Caspar David Friedrich, now in the Neue Pinakothek in Munich.

The artist is said to have given it to Johann Christian Finelius from Griefswald and until 1848 it was owned by Finelius's son Hermann Finelius, again in Griefswald. Hermann left it to his sister Friederike Buhtz, who in turn left it to Paul Hanow (1909–1936). It was lost in 1944 due to wartime conditions.

See also
List of works by Caspar David Friedrich

References

External links

Paintings by Caspar David Friedrich
1818 paintings
Collection of the Neue Pinakothek